Nominal numbers are numerals used as labels to identify items uniquely. Importantly, the actual values of the numbers which these numerals represent are less relevant, as they do not indicate quantity, rank, or any other measurement.

Labelling referees Smith and Jones as referees "1" and "2" is a use of nominal numbers. Any set of numbers (a subset of the natural numbers) will be consistent labels as long as a distinct number is uniquely used for each distinct term which needs to be labelled. Nonetheless, sequences of integers may naturally be used as the simplest way to begin labelling; for example, 1, 2, 3, and so on.

Definition
Allegedly, the term "nominal number" is quite recent and of limited use. It appears to have originated as used in school textbooks derived from the statistical term "nominal data", allegedly defined as data indicating "...merely statements of qualitative category of membership." This usage comes from the sense of nominal as "name".

Mathematically, nominal numbering is a one-to-one and onto function from a set of objects being named to a set of numerals, which may change (typically growing) over time: it is a function because each object is assigned a single numeral, it is one-to-one because different objects are assigned different numerals, and it is onto because every numeral in the set at a given time has associated with it a single named object.

"Nominal number" can be broadly defined as "any numeral used for identification, however it was assigned", or narrowly as "a numeral with no information other than identification".

For the purposes of naming, the term "number" is often used loosely to refer to any 
string (sequence of symbols), which may not consist entirely of digits—it is often alphanumeric. For instance, UK National Insurance numbers, some driver's license numbers, and some serial numbers contain letters.

Use of nominal numbers
"Nominal" refers to the use of numbers: any nominal number can be used by its numerical value as an integer—added to another, multiplied, compared in magnitude, and so forth—but for nominal numbers these operations are not, in general, meaningful. For example, the ZIP code 11111 is less than the ZIP code 12345, but that does not mean that 11111 was issued before 12345 or that the region denoted by 11111 is further south than 12345, though it might be. Similarly, one can add or subtract ZIP codes, but this is meaningless:  does not have any meaning as a ZIP code.

In general, the only meaningful operation with nominal numbers is to compare two nominal numbers to see whether they are identical or not (whether they refer to the same object).

Examples
A great variety of numbers meet the broad definition, including:
 National identification numbers, such as:
 Social Security numbers
 Driver's license numbers
 National Insurance number
 Routing numbers, such as:
 Bank codes and sort codes, such as International Bank Account Numbers or ABA routing transit numbers.
 Postal codes, such as ZIP codes (These are generally numeric in the United States, but other nations often use alphanumeric systems.)
 Telephone numbers, assigned by various telephone numbering plans, such as the ITU-T E.164 and the North American Numbering Plan (NANPA).
 Numbers of train or bus routes or the individual vehicles in public transport
 Car model names from some car manufacturers, such as BMW or Peugeot, are plain numbers.

These are usually assigned either in some hierarchical way, such as how telephone numbers are assigned (in NANPA) as Country Code + Area Code + Prefix + Suffix, where the first three are geographically based, or sequentially, as in serial numbers; these latter are thus properly ordinal numbers.

Narrowly defined
Numerical identifiers that are nominal numbers narrowly defined, viz, convey no information other than identity, are quite rare. These must be defined either arbitrarily or randomly, and most commonly arise in computer applications, such as dynamic IP addresses assigned by Dynamic Host Configuration Protocol. A more everyday example are sports squad numbers, which do not in general have any public meaning beyond identity, though they may be allocated based on some internal club or organization policy. In some settings, these are based on position, but in others they are associated with an individual, being a proper nominal number. The naming function is demonstrated by "retired numbers", where a club no longer issues a number that has become associated with a particularly famous player, but reallocate others to new players when they become available

See also 
 Numbering scheme
 Serial number
 Symbol (programming)
 Unique key
 Universally Unique Identifier

External links
Cardinal, Ordinal and Nominal Numbers
Cardinal, Ordinal, and Nominal Numbers

Identifiers
Numerals